Cornwall Bridge station is a former train station in Cornwall Bridge, Connecticut. The station building was built in the 1880s to serve passengers on the Housatonic Railroad. Passenger service on the line ended in 1971, at which time Penn Central auctioned off the station. The following year, the station received a National Register of Historic Places designation.

History

The station, a Stick style wood-frame structure, was built by the Housatonic Railroad in the 1880s to replace an earlier station. The Housatonic was acquired by the New York, New Haven and Hartford Railroad in 1892. The New Haven Railroad was acquired by the Penn Central Railroad in 1969, which went bankrupt by 1970. The station was added to the National Register of Historic Places on April 26, 1972, as Cornwall Bridge Railroad Station.

See also
National Register of Historic Places listings in Litchfield County, Connecticut

References

External links

Cornwall, Connecticut
Railway stations on the National Register of Historic Places in Connecticut
Transportation buildings and structures in Litchfield County, Connecticut
Stations along New York, New Haven and Hartford Railroad lines
National Register of Historic Places in Litchfield County, Connecticut
Former railway stations in Connecticut